Jānis Blūms (born 20 April 1982) is a former Latvian professional basketball player. He also served as the captain of the Latvian national basketball team.

Player career
Blūms started his career with Brocēni and later continued to play in their successor Skonto. In 2003, he signed with Polish club Anwil Włocławek, where he spent one season before returning to Latvia, where he joined BK Ventspils. After two years in Ventspils, Blūms joined Lithuanian powerhouse BC Lietuvos rytas. In 2007, Blūms accepted an offer from the Italian side Eldo Napoli where he had a decent season.

In 2008, Blūms signed a two-year contract with Bilbao Basket of Spain's ACB League. He spent four successful seasons in Bilbao. Some of the highlights with Bilbao include making Liga ACB finals, Euroleague quarterfinals and Eurocup Final Four (twice). During his tenure with Bilbao, Blūms developed a reputation as a fierce competitor who is deadly from three-point range and can play lock-down defense. Often he would guard the best player of the opposing team. Due to his passion and effort, he became one of the city's fan favorites.

After his experience in Basque Country, Jānis moved back to Lietuvos Rytas, which played Euroleague that season. In July 2013, Blūms signed a one-year contract with BC Astana.

On 1 October 2014, he signed with the Greek club Panathinaikos. On 5 April 2015, he won the Greek Cup.

In July 2015, Janis signed with the Italian team Sidigas Avellino, coming back to Italy after seven years.

On 23 August 2017, he signed with the Spanish club Tecnyconta Zaragoza.

On 28 July 2020, at the age of 38, he signed with Pallacanestro Reggiana of Lega Basket Serie A (LBA) but, by mutual agreement with the team, resigned after eight games played after the start of the season.

On 30 August 2021, Blums announced his retirement from professional basketball.

Career statistics

Euroleague

|-
| style="text-align:left;"| 2011–12
| style="text-align:left;"| Bilbao Basket
| 17 || 6 || 16.2 || .413 || .400 || .706 || 0.9 || 0.9 || 0.4 || 0.1 || 6.0 || 3.4
|-
| style="text-align:left;"| 2012–13
| style="text-align:left;"| Lietuvos rytas
| 9 || 5 || 19.8 || .309 || .316 || .875 || 1.9 || 1.8 || 0.6 || 0.1 || 5.9 || 4.7
|-
| style="text-align:left;"| 2014–15
| style="text-align:left;"| Panathinaikos
| 27 || 0 || 11.6 || .410 || .424 || .714 || 0.7 || 0.5 || 0.2 || 0.0 || 3.8 || 1.6
|- class="sortbottom"
| style="text-align:left;"| Career
| style="text-align:left;"|
| 53 || 11 || 14.6 || .384 || .390 || .744 || 1.0 || 0.8 || 0.3 || 0.0 || 4.8 || 2.7

Trivia
Blūms has declared that his favorite players and idols growing were Roberts Štelmahers and Ainars Bagatskis. Coincidentally, he played with Štelmahers in the Latvian national basketball team and Lietuvos rytas (2006-07).

In 2010-11, Blūms was notable for not missing a single practice or a game with Bilbao Basket. He reported to training camp by mid-August, and his season ended in mid-June as his team Liga ACB finals.

Latvian national team
Blūms was an iconic figure for the Latvian national basketball team, serving as the team's captain and making 170 appearances for the senior squad.

International stats

References

External links
ACB.com Profile
Euroleague Profile
Profile: Janis Blums, Panathinaikos Athens
FIBA Profile

Living people
1982 births
Basket Napoli players
BC Astana players
BC Rytas players
Bilbao Basket players
BK VEF Rīga players
BK Ventspils players
Latvian expatriate basketball people in Greece
Latvian expatriate basketball people in Italy
Greek Basket League players
KK Włocławek players
Latvian expatriate basketball people in Lithuania
Latvian expatriate basketball people in Poland
Latvian expatriate basketball people in Spain
Latvian men's basketball players
Lega Basket Serie A players
Liga ACB players
Panathinaikos B.C. players
People from Saldus
Point guards
S.S. Felice Scandone players
Shooting guards